John Lathrop (1740-1816) was a congregationalist minister in Boston, Massachusetts, during the revolutionary and early republic periods.

Lathrop was born 1740 and served as minister of the Second Church, Boston, 1768-1816, when it was located in the North End—first on North Square, and after 1779, on Hanover Street. In 1776, during the British occupation of Boston, the Second Church was burnt for firewood by British soldiers. Lathrop was considered a patriot. He was elected a Fellow of the American Academy of Arts and Sciences in 1790, and a member of the American Antiquarian Society in 1813.

Lathrop died in 1816.

Further reading

Works by Lathrop
 Innocent blood crying to God from the streets of Boston. A sermon occasioned by the horrid murder of Messieurs Samuel Gray, Samuel Maverick, James Caldwell, and Crispus Attucks, with Patrick Carr, since dead, and Christopher Monk, judged irrecoverable, and several other badly wounded, by a party of troops under the command of Captain Preston: on the fifth of March, 1770. And preached the Lord's-day following. Boston, Re-printed and sold by Edes and Gill, Opposite the New Court-House in Queen-Street, 1771.
 A discourse, preached on March the fifth, 1778. Boston: Draper & Folsom, 1778.
 A discourse, in two parts, preached at the commencement of the nineteenth century. Boston : Printed by E. Lincoln for John West, 1801.
 A discourse delivered in the church in Hollis Street, April 13, 1808, at the interment of the Rev. Samuel West, D.D., late pastor of said church. Boston : Printed by Belcher and Armstrong, 1808.
 Peace and war, in relation to the United States of America: a discourse, delivered in Boston, on the day of public thanksgiving in the state of Massachusetts, November 21, 1811. Boston : J.W. Burditt, 1811.
 A discourse, delivered in Boston, April 13, 1815 : the day of thanksgiving appointed by the president of the United States, in consequence of the peace. Boston : J.W. Burditt, 1815.
 A compendious history of the late war : containing an account of all the important battles, and many of the smaller actions, between the American, and the British forces, and Indians ... Boston : J.W. Burditt, 1815.

Works about Lathrop
 Chandler Robbins. A history of the Second Church, or Old North, in Boston: to which is added a History of the New Brick Church. Boston: John Wilson & Son, 1852.
 James A. Levernier. Phillis Wheatley and the New England Clergy. Early American Literature, Vol. 26, No. 1 (1991), pp. 21–38.
 Marc M. Arkin. The Force of Ancient Manners: Federalist Politics and the Unitarian Controversy Revisited. Journal of the Early Republic, Vol. 22, No. 4 (Winter, 2002), pp. 575–610.

References

External links
 Harvard Business School. Account book of the Rev. John Lathrop, 1780-1802

1740 births
1816 deaths
Clergy from Boston
18th century in Boston
People from colonial Boston
Fellows of the American Academy of Arts and Sciences
Members of the American Antiquarian Society
18th-century Christian clergy
Patriots in the American Revolution
18th-century American clergy